Intimacies of a Prostitute is a 1974 Argentine sexploitation drama film directed by Armando Bó and starring Isabel Sarli, Jorge Barreiro, and Sabina Olmos. Various dates of the release have been given, some as early as 1971 or 1972.

Cast
Isabel Sarli as Maria
Jorge Barreiro as Pocho
Sabina Olmos as Olga
Guillermo Battaglia as Antonio
Fidel Pintos as Hombre
Ricardo Passano as Comisario 
Raúl del Valle as Correa
Virginia Romay as Maria's mother
Reynaldo Mompel as Carlos Moreno
Horacio Bruno as Correntino
Olanka Wolk as Betty
Armando Bó as Jose Luis

References

External links
 

1974 films
1970s Spanish-language films
1970s erotic drama films
Argentine erotic drama films
Films about prostitution in Argentina
Films directed by Armando Bó
Sexploitation films
1974 drama films
1970s Argentine films